NYC Metro may refer to:

New York metropolitan area
New York City Subway